Aymen Ben Ahmed (born 1 March 1986) is a Tunisian athlete specializing in the 110 metres hurdles. He won the gold medal at the 
2006 African Championships. His personal best in the event is 13.76 s which is the current national record.

International competitions

External links

1986 births
Living people
Tunisian male hurdlers
Athletes (track and field) at the 2007 All-Africa Games
African Games competitors for Tunisia
Athletes (track and field) at the 2009 Mediterranean Games
Mediterranean Games competitors for Tunisia
21st-century Tunisian people